Battle of the rails can refer to:

 Railway sabotage during World War II
 The Battle of the Rails, a 1946 French film